Gheorghe Chivorchian (born April 12, 1955 in Bacău), is the general secretary of the Romanian Football Federation. From 1997 until 2014, he was president of different clubs from Romania.

His daughter Maria is a retired professional volleyball player.

References

1955 births
Sportspeople from Bacău
Living people
Romanian people of Armenian descent